The Aeroford was an English automobile that was manufactured in Bayswater, London from 1920 to 1925.  The Aeroford was an attempt to make the Ford Model T more attractive by disguising its appearance with a unique bonnet and radiator grille.

The Aeroford sold from £288 in 1920 before dropping to £168 to £214 by 1925. It was available as a two-seater, four-seater or coupé model.

See also
 List of car manufacturers of the United Kingdom

References

Bibliography 
 David Culshaw & Peter Horrobin: The Complete Catalogue of British Cars 1895–1975. Veloce Publishing plc. Dorchester (1999).  

Vintage vehicles
Defunct motor vehicle manufacturers of England
Vehicle manufacture in London
1920 establishments in England
1925 disestablishments in England
Vehicle manufacturing companies established in 1920
Defunct companies based in London
Vehicle manufacturing companies disestablished in 1925
British companies disestablished in 1925
British companies established in 1920